Rhinestone Rex and Miss Monica is a 2010 play by David Williamson about a romance between two middle aged people.

References

External links
Review at Stage Noise
Review of 2012 Brisbane production at Theatre People.com
Review of 2010 Ensemble Theatre production at Sydney Morning Herald
Review of 2010 Ensemble Theatre production at Crikey

2010 plays
Plays by David Williamson